Aatadukundam Raa is a 2016 Telugu-language action comedy drama film directed by G. Nageswara Reddy. The film stars Sushanth and Sonam Bajwa in the lead roles.

Cast 
 Sushanth as Karthik
 Sonam Bajwa as Shruthi
 Anand as Anand Rao
 Murali Sharma as Vijay Rao
 Brahmanandam as Girija Rao
 Posani Krishna Murali as Somaraju
 Raghu Babu as Kanaka Rao
 Rama Prabha
 Prudhvi Raj
 Vennela Kishore as Karthik's friend
 Jhansi
 Ananth Babu
Guest appearances
 Naga Chaitanya
 Akhil Akkineni in the song "Aatadukundam Raa"

Soundtrack 
The music was composed by Anup Rubens. The song "Palleku Podam" from Devadasu was reused for this film.

Release 
A critic from The Times of India states that "This film is a classic example of another film cashing in on the names of celebs". A critic from The Hindu wrote that "Rather than stepping into this time machine, watch some old hits of ANR or Nagarjuna".

References

External links

2010s Telugu-language films
Indian action comedy films
2016 masala films
Films about time travel
2016 films
Films directed by G. Nageswara Reddy